The third season of iCarly aired on Nickelodeon from September 12, 2009, to June 26, 2010. The season features Carly Shay (Miranda Cosgrove), Sam Puckett (Jennette McCurdy) and Freddie Benson (Nathan Kress) as they continue their own Web Show called iCarly. Jerry Trainor co-stars as Carly's big brother, Spencer Shay. This season was the result of split within the second season production of 45 episodes whereas 20 remaining episodes were marketed as the show's third season. 

When released to DVD, "iThink They Kissed" and "iCook" were featured on the "iCarly Season 2: Volume 2" DVD, while the rest of the season is released as "iCarly Season 2: Volume 3". This season had the specials "iThink They Kissed", "iMove Out", "iQuit iCarly" "iSaved Your Life", "iSpace Out", "iBloop" "iWon't Cancel the Show" and "iPsycho". A few episodes this season and last season were released on the "iCarly Collection" DVD that was released in July 2013.

Cast

Main cast

 Miranda Cosgrove as Carly Shay
 Jennette McCurdy as Sam Puckett
 Nathan Kress as Freddie Benson
 Jerry Trainor as Spencer Shay

Recurring cast

 Noah Munck as Gibby Gibson
 Mary Scheer as Marissa Benson
BooG!e as T-Bo
 Jeremy Rowley as Lewbert
Danielle Morrow as Nora Dershlit
 Emily Ratajkowski as Tasha
 Ryan Ochoa as Chuck Chambers
Ethan Munck as Guppy Gibson
 Mindy Sterling as Miss Briggs
 Tim Russ as Principal Franklin
David St. James as Mr. Howard

Guest stars
 Skyler Day as Magic Malika ("iSpeed Date")
 Chord Overstreet as Eric ("iSpeed Date")
 Kit Pongetti as Marta Trundel ("iFind Lewbert's Lost Love")
 Christopher Michael as Officer Carl ("iMove Out")
 Lane Napper as Ernie ("iWas a Pageant Girl")
 Betsy Rue as Ginger Fox ("iFix a Pop Star")
 Drake Bell as himself ("iBloop")
 Daniella Monet as Popular Girl ("iPsycho")
 Drew Roy as Griffin ("iBeat the Heat")

Season synopsis
In the season opener, Sam, intoxicated and giggly from nitrous oxide, spills the beans to Carly about her and Freddie's first kiss, which she cannot remember soon afterwards. When Carly tells Freddie what Sam said, he changes the subject and so Carly attempts to pin him down just to get him to confess. Freddie then says it is true, so Carly then asks Sam and Freddie to come to her apartment without telling each other and when they arrive, she confronts them about keeping the kiss a secret from her. In the end, Sam and Freddie decide it is time to stop keeping secrets and tell Carly that they will tell each other everything.

Two weeks later, the three find themselves in a Girl's-Choice-Dance situation, so they have to find dates to the dance. When all three dates end badly; Sam finding out that her "potential" date, Gibby, has a girlfriend, Freddie being somewhat annoyed at his date's magic tricks and Carly constantly being interrupted by her date, Carly and Freddie engage in a romantic slow-dance at the Groovy Smoothie. It is at this moment that Sam walks in and sees them. Upon seeing them, she silently walks away.

Three months later, Freddie pushes Carly out of the way of an oncoming taco truck on the road, saving her life and getting himself injured in the process. Carly is so grateful that she visits his room often to take care of him and at one point kisses him. In just hours of Carly and Freddie beginning their relationship, Sam tells Freddie, based on her experience with a boyfriend who sent her bacon, that Freddie is Carly's bacon, that she only loves him for what he did. Freddie does not believe her at first, but later that night, at Carly's apartment, he realizes that this may be true and tells her this. The two end their short relationship, but decide that once the whole "hero" thing wears off and Carly is attracted to Freddie because of who he is, they will try the relationship again.

Episodes

As a result of this season being part of the second season production count, this set of episodes maintains their Season 2 production codes.

References

2009 American television seasons
2010 American television seasons
3